Eddie Denis (born 14 October 1970) is an Australian water polo player who competed in the 2000 Summer Olympics.

See also
 Australia men's Olympic water polo team records and statistics
 List of men's Olympic water polo tournament goalkeepers

References

External links
 

1970 births
Living people
Australian male water polo players
Water polo goalkeepers
Olympic water polo players of Australia
Water polo players at the 2000 Summer Olympics